The Yasar Dogu Tournament 2006, was a wrestling event held in Samsun, Turkey between 3 and 4 February 2006. This tournament was held as 34th.

This international tournament includes competition includes competition in men's  freestyle wrestling. This ranking tournament was held in honor of the two time Olympic Champion, Yaşar Doğu.

Medal table

Medal overview

Men's freestyle

Participating nations

References 

Yasar Dogu 2006
2006 in sport wrestling
Sports competitions in Samsun
Yaşar Doğu Tournament
International wrestling competitions hosted by Turkey